Jessica Wooden (born August 21, 1988) is an American rugby union player. She was selected for the squad to the 2017 Women's Rugby World Cup in Ireland.

Rugby career 
Wooden began playing rugby in her senior year at the University of Florida. She plays for the Harlequins Ladies in the Premier 15s. Her previous club was Aylesford Bulls Ladies before they merged with Harlequins Ladies.

She trained at the American Rugby Pro Training Center in a bid for a spot on the Eagles 2016 Olympic team.

References

External links
 Jessica Wooden at USA Rugby

1988 births
Living people
American female rugby union players
United States women's international rugby union players
University of Florida alumni
21st-century American women